Androgen-dependent TFPI-regulating protein is a protein in humans that is encoded by the ADTRP gene.

References

Further reading 

Genes on human chromosome 6